Peter Dickinson (born 15 November 1934) is an English composer, musicologist, author, and pianist, best known for his experimental musical compositions and writings on American music.

Biography
He was born in Lytham St Annes, Lancashire, and studied organ at Queens' College, Cambridge, where he was a student of Philip Radcliffe. In 1958 he became a student at the Juilliard School in New York City, and studied with Bernard Wagenaar, and encountered the works of experimental composers such as Cowell, Cage, and Edgard Varèse.  Returning to England in 1962, he established courses in improvisation and experimental music at the College of St. Mark and St. John, Chelsea.  After a lectureship at Birmingham (1966–1970), he became the first professor of music at Keele University in 1974, where he created an important center for the study of American music.  He held that position until 1984. He served as chair of music at Goldsmiths College, University of London from 1991 to 1997, and in 1996 became a Fellow and head of music at the Institute of United States Studies in London.

In July 1964 he married Bridget Jane Tomkinson, and they have two sons. As a pianist, he has often performed works by Charles Ives with his sister, mezzo-soprano Meriel Dickinson, reflecting his affinity for that composer.  He has also accompanied several acclaimed instrumentalists, such as violinist Ralph Holmes and oboist Sarah Francis.  He has also made several international lecture-recital tours.

In 1980 he became a founding member of the Association of Professional Composers and was named a Fellow of the Royal Society of Arts a year later.  He has also been a board member of Trinity College of Music since 1984 and a member of the Royal Society of Musicians since 1985. He is also chair of the Bernarr Rainbow Trust, a charity set up in 1997 for the benefit of music education.

Music
His musical compositions include experimental and aleatoric elements, and are compared to works by Stravinsky, Ives and Satie. Other influences include the music of John Cage, as well as ragtime, blues, and jazz. He layers both serious and popular musical styles together to create what he calls a style modulation. The composer explained his interest in combining musical styles: "Ever since hearing live performances of Charles Ives in New York in the late 1950s and first meeting John Cage there, I have been interested in the effect of hearing different types of music simultaneously." His layering is achieved in a different manner to William Bolcom's "aggressively parodic and deconstructive manner", using more of a "genuine warmth of enthusiasm for the material he is exploiting which suggests something closer to a homage.",

The core of Dickinson's output is the set of three concertos, for organ, piano and violin. The Organ Concerto was written for the 1971 Three Choirs Festival. The Piano Concerto (dedicated to the soloist Howard Shelley) was commissioned by the Cheltenham Festival and first performed on July 22, 1984, at Cheltenham Town Hall, with the Philharmonia Orchestra conducted by Edward Downes. The Violin Concerto was commissioned by the BBC and first performed and broadcast on 27 March 1987 by the BBC Philhamonic Orchestra, soloist Ernst Kovacic, conducted by Bryden Thomson. It was recorded for the first time by the BBC in 2014 to mark the composer's 80th birthday by Chloe Hanslip with the BBC National Orchestra of Wales conducted by Clark Rundell. All three are concentrated works, in single movement form and (like much of Dickinson's music) all three have connections with popular music. The Organ Concerto includes a blues song, there's a rag in the Piano Concerto, and the Violin Concerto's opening theme combines Beethoven with a waltz and a 1930s popular song.

His instrumental compositions are for a great variety of musical ensembles, from full orchestra to a single instrument, and there are many keyboard works.  He has also composed many songs for solo voice and pieces for various choral ensembles.  His modern works for historical instruments are notable.  He has composed for better-known historical instruments such as recorder and harpsichord, as well as for less-familiar ones, such as the clavichord and baryton.  In contrast to the use of these instruments, he has also added electronic sounds to some works.

Writing
As a prolific writer, he has often shown his varied interests in American music.  He wrote a series of articles on improvisation in 1964, and more recently has discussed postmodernism, coining the term 'style modulation' to describe the weaving together of serious and popular or past and present music.  The term can be applied to his own music, which adds a mix of ragtime, jazz, serial music, and even electronic playback to more traditional types of instrumental musical forms.

Musical compositions
Vocal music

Stage works
The Judas Tree (music theatre, T. Blackburn), actors, 2 T, chorus, brass, perc, str, 1965
Choral works
Jesus Christ is Risen [Born] Today, SATB, 1955
Mag and Nunc, unison chorus, organ, 1963
2 Motets (Blackburn): John, Mark, ATB, 1963, rev. SATB, 1990
Christmas is Coming, SATB, 1964
4 Poems (Gerard Manly Hopkins), Bar soloists, chorus, org, 1964
Mass, SATB, 1965
When I was a Sailor, chorus, 2 insts, perc, 1965
For the Nativity, SATB, 1966
Martin of Tours (Blackburn), T, Bar, chorus 2vv, chbr org, pf duet, 1966
3 Complaints, unison chorus, insts, perc, 1966
The Dry Heart (A. Porter), SATB, 1967
Communion Service, 2 pt chorus, org, 1968
Outcry (W. Blake, J. Clare, T. Hardy), A, SATB, orch, 1968
Late Afternoon in November (Dickinson), 16 solo vv, 1975
A Mass of the Apocalypse, SATB, spkr, perc, pf, 1984
Tiananmen 1989, double SATB, tubular bells, 1990
Solo vocal
Four Songs (W. H. Auden), S, pf, 1956
A Dylan Thomas Cycle, Bar, pf, 1959
Let the Florid Music, T, pf, 1960
Three Comic Songs (W. H. Auden), T, pf, 1960, rev. 1972
An e. e. cummings cycle, Mez, pf, 1965
somewhere i have never travelled (W. H. Auden)Mez, pf, 1965
Elegy (Swinburne), Ct, vc, hpd, 1966
A Red, Red Rose (Burns), Mez, pf, 1967 [from Songs in Blue]
4 Poems (A. Porter), Ct, hpd, 1967
Extravaganzas (G. Corso), Mez, pf, 1970
So We'll go no more A-Roving (Byron), Mez, pf, 1971 [in Songs in Blue];
Winter Afternoons (Emily Dickinson), 6 solo vv, db, 1971
Surrealist Landscape (Lord Berners), Ct/Mez, pf, tape
Lust (St. Augustine, Dickinson), 6 solo vv, 1974
A Memory of David Munrow (wordless), 2 Ct, 2 rec, va da gamba, hpd, 1977
Schubert in Blue (William Shakespeare), Mez, pf, 1977 [after Franz Schubert; in Songs in Blue]
Songs in Blue, med voice, pf, 1977
Reminiscences, Mez, sax, pf, 1978
The Unicorns (J. Heath-Stubbs), S, brass band, 1982
Stevie's Tunes (S. Smith), Mez, pf, 1984
Larkin's Jazz, spkr/Bar, fl + a fl, cl + b cl + E cl, s sax, tpt, vc, pf, perc, 1989
Summoned by Mother (J. Betjeman), Mez, hp, 1991
Three Carols, SSA, 1997

Instrumental works

Orchestral works
Vitalitas, 1959/1960
Monologue, strings, 1959
Five Diversions, 1969
Satie Transformations (based on Trois Gnossiennes), 1970
Concerto for strings, percussion, and Electronic organ, 1971 [withdrawn]
Organ Concerto, 1971
A Birthday Surprise (Three variations on Happy Birthday to You), 1979
Piano Concerto, 1984
Violin Concerto, 1986
Jigsaws, chamber orchestra, 1988
Merseyside Echoes, 1988

Chamber and solo instrumental
Fantasy, cl, pf, 1956; 
Threnody, vc, pf, 1956
String Quartet no. 1, 1958
Air, fl, 1959
Fantasia, vn, 1959
3 Juilliard Dances, fl, cl, bn, tpt, trombones, perc, pf, vc, 1959
Sonata, vn, pf, 1961
Baroque Trio, fl, ob, hpd, 1962
4 Duos, fl/ob, vc, 1962
Music for Oboe and Chamber Organ, 1962
Sonatina, solo bassoon, 1966
Fanfares and Elegies, 3 tpt, 3 trombones, org, 1967
Metamorphosis, fl, 1971
Translations, recorder, bass viol, harpsichord, 1971
Recorder Music, recorder, tape, 1973
String Quartet no.2, with tape/pf, 1975
Solo for Baryton, tape/b viol/baryton, 1976
Aria, ob, cl, bn, hn, 1977
Lullaby, ob/cl, pf, 1982
The Unicorns, brass band, 1984 [arr. of vocal work], 1982–1984
American Trio (Hymns, Rags and Blues), vn, cl, pf, 1985
London Rags, 2 tpt, hn, trombones, tuba, 1986
Auden Studies, ob, pf, 1988
Cellars Clough Duo, 2 guitars, 1988
5 Explorations, guitar, 1989
Suffolk Variations, guitar, 1992
Swansongs, vc, pf, 1993
Celebration Trio, vn, cl, pf, 2009
Bach in Blue, vn, cl, pf, 2012
Three Early Pieces, arr. recorder, piano, 2012

Keyboard

A Cambridge Postlude, organ, 1953
Postlude on Adeste Fideles, organ, 1954
Toccata, organ, 1955
Vitalitas Variations, piano, 1957, orchestrated for ballet, 1959
Variations on a French Folk Tune, harpsichord, 1957
Meditation on Murder in the Cathedral, organ, 1958
Study in Pianissimo, organ, 1959
Paraphrase 1, organ, 1967
Paraphrase 2, piano, 1967
Satie Transformations, piano, 1970
Suite for the Centenary of Lord Berners, clavichord, 1972
Conc. Rag, piano, 1973, rev. 1984
Piano Blues, 1973
Quartet Rag, piano, 1975
Blue Rose, piano, 1979
Hymn-Tune Rag, piano, 1985
Wild Rose Rag, piano, 1985
Blue Rose Variations, organ, 1985
Patriotic Rag, piano, 1986
Sonatas for piano, piano & tape playback, 1987
A Millennium Fanfare, organ, 1999
Bach in Blue, piano, 2004

Written publications
'Charles Ives 1874–1954', MT, cv (1964), 347–9
'Improvisation', MT, cv (1964), 294–5, 377–8, 538–9, 612–13, 688–9, 766–7
'John Cage', Music and Musicians, xiv/3 (1965–66), 32–4, 54 only, 56 only
'Erik Satie (1866–1925)', MR, xxviii (1967), 139–46
'A New Perspective for Ives', MT, cxv (1974), 836–8
ed.: American Music: Keele 1975
ed.: Twenty British Composers (London, 1975) [incl. ‘Transformations of Erik Satie’, p. 47]
'A Note on Some Recent Works', MT, cxviii (1977), 559 only [on Dickinson's works]
'Recent Research on American Musical Traditions', IMSCR XII: Berkeley 1977, 353–82
‘The Achievement of Ragtime: an Introductory Study with some Implications for British Research in Popular Music’, PRMA, cv (1978–79), 63–76
‘Lord Berners, 1883–1950’, MT, cxxiv (1983), 669–72
‘William Schumann: an American Symphonist at 75’, MT, cxxvi (1985), 457–8
‘Stein, Satie, Cummings, Thomson, Berners, Cage: Toward a Context for the Music of Virgil Thomson’, MQ, lxxii (1986), 394–409
‘Directors of a Decade’, MT, cxxviii (1987), 15–17
The Music of Lennox Berkeley (London, 1988; 2nd enlarged edition Woodbridge, 2003)
‘The American Concerto’, A Companion to the Concerto, ed. R. Layton (New York, 1989), 305–325
‘Style-Modulation: an Approach to Stylistic Pluralism’, MT, cxxx (1989), 208–11
‘Virgil Thomson (1896–1989)’, MT, cxxxi (1990), 31 only
‘Nationalism is Not Enough: a Composer's Perspective’, Music and Nationalism in 20th-Century Great Britain and Finland, ed. T. Mäkelä (Hamburg, 1997), 27–34
Marigold: the Music of Billy Mayerl (Oxford, 1999)
Copland Connotations: Studies and Interviews (Woodbridge, 2002)
CageTalk: Dialogues with & about John Cage (Rochester, NY, 2006)
Lord Berners: Composer, writer, Painter (Woodbridge, 2008)
Samuel Barber Remembered (Rochester, NY, 2010)
Lennox Berkeley and Friends: Writings, Letters and Interviews (Woodbridge, 2012)
Words and Music (Woodbridge, 2016)
Many other articles and reviews in the Musical Times, Music and Letters, The Musical Quarterly, The Independent, The Times Literary Supplement, Musical Opinion and The Times Higher Education Supplement

Footnotes

References

.

Further reading
 

1934 births
Living people
English composers
People from Lytham St Annes
Alumni of Queens' College, Cambridge
Albany Records artists